The Vietnamese Buddhist Youth Association (also known as Vietnamese Buddhist Family (Vietnamese: Gia Đình Phật Tử Việt Nam (GĐPTVN)) is a lay Buddhist youth organisation that seeks to imbue its members with Buddhist ethics. 

The organization was originally established in the 1940s, officially name GĐPTVN in 1951 and has been in existence for about 80 years in Vietnam and in Overseas Vietnamese communities since the Fall of Saigon, and are usually associated with Buddhist temples.

External links
 GĐPT Hoa Nghiêm (Fort Belvoir, VA) Website
Chanh Phap Buddhist Youth Association
Ottawa Chapter
 GĐPT VIỆT NAM's website 
 GĐPT's website 
  

Buddhism in Vietnam
Buddhist youth organizations
Buddhist charities
Religious organizations established in 1986